Pulse is the third live album by the English rock band Pink Floyd. It was released on 29 May 1995 by EMI in the United Kingdom and on 6 June 1995 by Columbia in the United States. The album was recorded during the European leg of Pink Floyd's Division Bell Tour in 1994.

Content and recording
The album is notable for including a complete live version of The Dark Side of the Moon. It also features "Astronomy Domine", a Syd Barrett song not performed since the early 1970s. The track "Another Brick in the Wall, Part II" features small portions of the songs "Another Brick in the Wall, Part I", "The Happiest Days of Our Lives" and "Another Brick in the Wall, Part III".

Unlike the previous live album Delicate Sound of Thunder, no parts of the songs were re-recorded in the studio. However, the band and Guthrie fixed songs that had bad notes (as heard on some bootlegs) by lifting solos and corrected vocal lines from other performances as the band recorded most of the European leg. The album was mixed in QSound, which produces a 3D audio effect even on a two channel stereo system.

Release history
In the United States, despite a price of $34.99 (which included flashing spine light and two AA batteries) Pulse debuted at number one on the Billboard 200 during the week of 24 June 1995 with 198,000 copies sold, it became the first multidisc album to top the Billboard 200 since the chart started using SoundScan data in May 1991. The next week it fell off to number three on the chart. It remained on the chart for twenty two weeks. It was certified two times platinum by the RIAA on 31 July 1995 for shipments of one million units.

On 1 July 1995 the video version of Pulse debuted at number one on the Billboard's Top Music Videos chart with 16,500 units sold. The video was certified eight times platinum by the RIAA on 31 July 2006 for shipments of 800,000 units.

The video version (on VHS and Laserdisc) also featured the song "Take It Back," and an almost complete performance from their 20 October show at Earl's Court, London. The Pulse DVD was released on 10 July 2006. On 16 December 2021, the band announced on social media platforms that a re-release of "Pulse" on DVD and a first-time release on Blu-ray format will be on 18 February 2022. The packaging will re-introduce the blinking LED featured with the original CD release from 1995.

The vinyl version was released as a four-LP box set and included "One of These Days" (also heard on the cassette release) as well as a large version of the photo booklet.

The original CD cover features an "eye-like" machine that has clock pieces inside, there is a planet in its centre, and on the outside it shows evolution as it moves backwards. It starts in the sea, moves to the bacteria which evolve into fishes, then into egg type creatures, then into eggs that hatch birds, and birds follow the trail of an aeroplane. There are six pyramids in the desert, and in the bottom of the sea, one can observe a city in the shore.

The debut of the album was highlighted by a light show from the top of the Empire State Building in New York City with music simulcasted on a New York City radio station.

LED packaging
Early CD versions came with a flashing red LED on the side of the case. This was designed by EMI contractor Jon Kempner, who was awarded the platinum disc, using the now discontinued LM3909 LED flasher IC. The circuit was powered by a single AA battery; the battery life was stated to be over six months. Some versions were also made with two AA batteries and later editions of the CD set did not feature the blinking LED.

Track listing

Personnel

Pink Floyd
David Gilmour – lead vocals, lead guitar and lap steel guitar (on "One of These Days", "High Hopes" and "The Great Gig In the Sky")
Nick Mason – drums, percussion (on "Time")
Richard Wright – keyboards, backing vocals, lead vocals on "Astronomy Domine", co-lead vocals on "Time", "Us and Them" and "Comfortably Numb"

Additional personnel
Guy Pratt – bass, backing vocals, co-lead vocals on "Run Like Hell"
Jon Carin – keyboards, backing vocals, co-lead vocals on "Hey You"
Sam Brown – backing vocals, first vocalist on "The Great Gig in the Sky"
Durga McBroom – backing vocals, second vocalist on "The Great Gig in the Sky"
Claudia Fontaine – backing vocals, third vocalist on "The Great Gig in the Sky"
Tim Renwick – guitar, backing vocals
Dick Parry – saxophone
Gary Wallis – percussion, additional drums
Doug Sax, Ron Lewter – mastering at The Mastering Lab

Charts

Weekly charts

Year-end charts

Certifications and sales

References

External links
 
 
 Pink Floyd Drums: The Division Bell PULSE Tour Drums 

Albums with cover art by Storm Thorgerson
Albums produced by David Gilmour
Albums produced by James Guthrie (record producer)
Pink Floyd live albums
1995 live albums
Columbia Records live albums
EMI Records live albums